Hardyal Dhindsa (born February 1956) is a British politician, and the former Police and Crime Commissioner for Derbyshire, representing the Labour Party. He was elected to the post on 5 May 2016, succeeding the previous incumbent, Alan Charles. He was defeated by the Conservative Party candidate Angelique Foster in the 2021 election.

Election history

External links 
Derbyshire PCC

References

1956 births
Living people
Alumni of Bangor University
Police and crime commissioners in England
Labour Party police and crime commissioners
British politicians of Indian descent
People from Derby